Dauksti Parish is an administrative unit of Gulbene Municipality (prior to the 2009 administrative reforms the Gulbene District), Latvia.

Towns, villages and settlements of Dauksti parish

References 

Parishes of Latvia
Gulbene Municipality